Rajvir Dahiya (born May 30, 1956), is an American Indian medical oncology scientist with expertise in urology oncology diagnosis, prognosis and risk assessment through genetic and epigenetic technology. Dahiya retired in 2021 as a Professor Emeritus and Director of Urology Oncology Research Center at the Veterans Affairs Medical Center and the University of California San Francisco School of Medicine (UCSF) after 34 years of service.

Early life and family 
Dahiya was born in Bidhlan, Sonipat, Haryana, India. His parents were farmers. He finished his PhD in 1983 in the field of Experimental Medicine from Post Graduate Institute of Medical Education and Research Chandigarh, India. After completing his PhD, Dahiya joined the University of Chicago Pritzker School of Medicine and did his post doctoral fellowship in medical oncology and molecular biology. After completing his fellowship, Dahiya joined UCSF School of Medicine and San Francisco Veterans Affairs Medical Center (VAMC) in 1987. He became director of Urology Research Center at the of the UCSF/VAMC in 1991. After 34 years of service at the UCSF,  he retired as a Professor Emeritus and Director of Urology Research Center. Also retired as a Senior Research Career Scientist from the Department of Veterans Affairs, Washington DC.

Positions and publications 
Dahiya was a scientific reviewer for the medical research programs in prostate, ovarian and breast cancer at the United States Army Department of Defense’s (DOD). He was also a member of various scientific committees for National Institutes of Health (NIH), including the National Cancer Institute (NCI) and the National Institute of Diabetes and Digestive and Kidney Diseases (NIDDK). Dahiya is a medical research advisor and scientific reviewer for several international programs and institutions.

Dahiya has published more than 400 original research manuscripts. He has written books and holds multiple patents in oncology. Based on the NIH and VA data base NIH Reporter, Dahiya's research programs were supported by the NIH and VA. Dahiya was a scientific adviser to the President of India Dr. A.P.J. Abul Kalam (Avul Pakir Jainulabdeen Abdul Kalam, 11th President of India from 2002-2007). Dahiya was an Associate Editor of Cancer Research, an Associate Editor of Clinical Cancer Research, an Academic Editor of “PLoS ONE, and a senior academic editor of American Journal of Cancer Research.

Retractions 
In 2022 it was reported that a joint investigation by the University of California San Francisco and the San Francisco Veterans Affairs Medical Center revealed examples of fabrication or falsification in some of Dahiya's published work. As of 2022 Dahiya has had four of his research publications retracted, one paper has received an expression of concern, and one paper has been corrected.

References

External links
 Rajvir Dahiya, USCF Profile

Living people
1956 births